French Island Generating Plant is a waste fired electrical power station located on French Island in La Crosse, Wisconsin. Unit 1 and 2 are boiler / steam turbine units originally constructed in the 1940s operating on coal. They were converted to burn oil  in the early 1970s. When oil became too costly, alternative fuels were used. Unit 2 was converted to burn waste wood in an Atmospheric Fluidized Bed Combustion Boiler in the early 1980s with unit 1 following in 1987.

RDF
The two boiler units also burn Refuse derived fuel (RDF) diverting solid waste from the municipal landfill. The facility normally burns 50/50 mix of RDF and wood waste. The result of burning RDF is the release of dioxins and dioxin-like compounds into the air. Excessive dioxin releases have forced the shutdown of the boilers as recently as October 2007.

Units

See also
List of power stations in Wisconsin

References

External links
https://web.archive.org/web/20100205103011/http://xcelenergy.com/Minnesota/Company/About_Energy_and_Rates/Power%20Generation/WisconsinPlants/Pages/FrenchIslandGeneratingPlant.aspx
https://web.archive.org/web/20110521083614/http://dnr.wi.gov/air/PermitZIP/632022820-P01.zip
http://www.scorecard.org/env-releases/facility.tcl?tri_id=54603NRTHR200SB

Energy infrastructure completed in 1941
Buildings and structures in La Crosse County, Wisconsin
Oil-fired power stations in Wisconsin
Xcel Energy